Berlanga is a Spanish municipality in the province of Badajoz, Extremadura. It has a population of 2,546 (2007) and an area of 127.8 km².

References

External links
Official website 

Municipalities in the Province of Badajoz